Horion-Hozémont is a village of Wallonia and a district of the municipality of Grâce-Hollogne, located in the province of Liège, Belgium.

Horion-Hozémont was its own municipality until January 1, 1977 when it was merged with Grâce-Hollogne as part of the fusion of municipalities in Belgium. The hamlet of Cahottes was part of Horion-Hozémont until then, but was transferred to the Mons-lez-Liège district of the municipality of Flémalle. Horion-Hozémont's postal code is 4460.

Notable residents
François Jacqmin (1929-1992), poet, born in Horion-Hozémont
John Wartique (born 1990), racing driver, born in Horion-Hozémont

Former municipalities of Liège Province
Grâce-Hollogne